The tarsi (tarsal plates) are two comparatively thick, elongated plates of dense connective tissue, about  in length for the upper eyelid and 5 mm for the lower eyelid; one is found in each eyelid, and contributes to its form and support. They are located directly above the lid margins.  The tarsus has a lower and upper part making up the palpebrae.

Superior
It is adjoined by the superior tarsal muscle.

To the anterior surface of this plate the aponeurosis of the levator palpebræ superioris is attached.

Inferior
The free or ciliary margins of these plates are thick and straight.

Relations
The attached or orbital margins are connected to the circumference of the orbit by the orbital septum.

The lateral angles are attached to the zygomatic bone by the lateral palpebral raphe.

The medial angles of the two plates end at the lacrimal lake, and are attached to the frontal process of the maxilla by the medial palpebral ligament).

The sulcus subtarsalis is a groove in the inner surface of each eyelid.

Along the inner margin of the tarsus are modified sebaceous glands known as tarsal glands (or meibomian glands), aligned vertically within the tarsi: 30 to 40 glands in the upper lid, and 20 to 30 in the lower lid, which secrete a lipid-rich product which helps keep the lacrimal secretions or tears from evaporating too quickly, thus keeping the eye moist.

Additional images

See also 
 List of specialized glands within the human integumentary system

References

Human eye anatomy